RTFM is an initialism and internet slang for the expression "read the fucking manual"typically used to reply to a basic question where the answer is easily found in the documentation, user guide, owner's manual, man page, online help, internet forum, software documentation or FAQ.

Usage is variously viewed as a pointed reminder of etiquette to try to find a solution before posting to a mass forum or email alias; helping a newer user (colloquially and demeaningly referred to as a noob within internet culture) to improve themselves; as a useless response; or as a hostile and elitist response. Polite usages would mention where one has looked when asking a question, and to provide an exact location or link where exactly to RTFM. 

In expurgated texts, substitutions such as "read the frickn' manual", "read the factory manual", "read the field manual", "read the flaming manual", "read the fine manual", "read the friendly manual", "read the [pause] manual" or similar variants are used.

If there is no appropriate content in the manual but the answer is frequently seen in the forum, a similar response in internet culture might be to Lurk moar, meaning to observe the forum for a time before asking questions.

List of similar initialisms
  – "read the bloody manual"
  – "read the fucking/featured article"– common on news forums such as Fark and Slashdot, where using "TFA" instead of "the article" has become a meme
  – "read the damn article"
  – "read the damn menu"
  – "read the damn manual"
  – "write a better manual" – an answer complaining that the manual is not written well
  – "read the fucking documentation"
  – "read the fucking error"
  – "read the fucking manual for once"
  – "read the fucking wiki"
  – "read the fucking chart" – a response that physicians give to coders who submit inappropriate queries
  – "read the fucking source" or "read the fucking standard" or "read the fucking syllabus"
  – "read the fucking binary"
  – "read the fucking question"
  – "read the manual, stupid"
  – "search the fucking web"
  – "Google is your friend"
  – "just fucking Google it"
  – "do your own research"
 ,  – "let me Google that for you"

See also
 User error - Acronyms and other names

References

External links

 

Internet slang
Technical communication
Acronyms

de:Liste von Abkürzungen (Netzjargon)#R